Buddhism (Pali and  Buddha Dharma) is a religion and philosophy encompassing a variety of traditions, beliefs and practices, largely based on teachings attributed to Siddhartha Gautama, commonly known as the Buddha, "the awakened one".

The following outline is provided as an overview of, and topical guide to, Buddhism.

The Buddha 

Gautama Buddha
 Tathāgata — meaning "Thus Come One" and "Thus Gone One" simultaneously, the epithet the Buddha uses most often to refer to himself; occasionally it is used as a general designation for a person who has reached the highest attainment
 Buddha's Birthday
 The Four Sights — observations that affected Prince Siddhartha deeply and made him realize the sufferings of all beings, and compelled him to begin his spiritual journey
 An old man
 A sick man
 A dead man
 An ascetic/Monk
 Qualities of the Buddha
 Abandonment of all defilements (kilesa — principally greed, hatred and delusion) together with their residual impressions (vasana)
 All defilements have been abandoned totally — all defilements have been destroyed with none remaining
 All defilements have been abandoned completely — each defilement has been destroyed at the root, without residue
 All defilements have been abandoned finally — no defilement can ever arise again in the future
 Acquisition of all virtues
 Great Wisdom (Mahapaññā)
 Extensiveness of range — understanding the totality of existent phenomena
 Profundity of view — understanding the precise mode of existence of each phenomenon
 Great Compassion (Maha-karuṇā)
 Physical characteristics of the Buddha
 Buddha footprint
 Buddha statue (Buddharupa)
 Iconography of Gautama Buddha in Laos and Thailand
 Depictions of Gautama Buddha in film
 Miracles of Gautama Buddha
 List of places where Gautama Buddha stayed
 Colours of Buddha's aura (prabashvara)
 Sapphire blue (nila)
 Golden yellow (pita)
 Crimson (lohita)
 White (odata)
 Scarlet (manjesta)
 Family of Gautama Buddha
 Śuddhodana (father)
 Māyā (mother)
 Yasodharā (wife)
 Rāhula (son)
 Mahāpajāpatī Gotamī (foster mother)
 Nanda (half-brother)
 Ānanda (cousin)
 Anuruddha (cousin)
 Devadatta (cousin)
 Teachers of the Bodhisatta Gotama
 Āḷāra Kālāma — taught Gautama the Jhanic Stage of nothingness
 Uddaka Rāmaputta — taught Gautama the Jhanic Stage of neither perception nor non-perception
 Gautama Buddha in world religions
 Gautama Buddha in Hinduism

Branches of Buddhism

Schools of Buddhism 

Schools of Buddhism

Theravāda 

Theravada — literally, "the Teaching of the Elders" or "the Ancient Teaching", it is the oldest surviving Buddhist school. It was founded in India. It is relatively conservative, and generally closer to early Buddhism, and for many centuries has been the predominant religion of Sri Lanka (now about 70% of the population) and most of continental Southeast Asia.
 Bangladesh:
 Sangharaj Nikaya
 Mahasthabir Nikaya
 Burma:
 Thudhamma Nikaya
 Vipassana tradition of Mahasi Sayadaw
 Shwekyin Nikaya
 Dvaya Nikaya or Dvara Nikaya
 Cambodia
 Laos
 Sri Lanka:
 Siam Nikaya
 Amarapura Nikaya
 Ramañña Nikaya
 Thailand:
 Maha Nikaya
 Dhammakaya Movement
 Thammayut Nikaya
 Thai Forest Tradition
 Tradition of Ajahn Chah

Mahāyāna 

Mahayana — literally the "Great Vehicle", it is the largest school of Buddhism, and originated in India.  The term is also used for classification of Buddhist philosophies and practice. According to the teachings of Mahāyāna traditions, "Mahāyāna" also refers to the path of seeking complete enlightenment for the benefit of all sentient beings, also called "Bodhisattvayāna", or the "Bodhisattva Vehicle."

 Madhyamaka
 Prāsangika
 Svatantrika
 Sanlun (Three Treatise school)
 Sanron
 Maha-Madhyamaka (Jonangpa)
 Yogācāra
 Cittamatra in Tibet
 Wei-Shi (Consciousness-only school) or Faxiang (Dharma-character school)
 Beopsang
 Hossō
 Tathagatagarbha
 Daśabhūmikā (absorbed into Huayan)
 Huayan
 Hwaeom
 Kegon
 Chán / Zen / Seon / Thien
 Caodong
 Sōtō
 Keizan line
 Jakuen line
 Giin line
 Linji
 Rinzai
 Ōbaku
 Fuke
 Won Buddhism: Korean Reformed Buddhism
 Pure Land (Amidism)
 Jodo Shu
 Jodo Shinshu
 Tiantai (Lotus Sutra School)
 Cheontae
 Tendai (also contains Vajrayana elements)
 Nichiren
 Nichiren Shū
 Nichiren Shōshū
 Nipponzan Myōhōji
 Soka Gakkai

Vajrayāna 

Vajrayana

 Tibetan Buddhism
 Nyingma
 New Bön (synthesis of Yungdrung Bön and Nyingmapa)
 Kadam
 Sakya
 Ngor-pa
 Tsar-pa
 Jonang
 Gelug
 Kagyu:
 Shangpa Kagyu
 Marpa Kagyu:
 Rechung Kagyu
 Dagpo Kagyu:
 Karma Kagyu (or Kamtshang Kagyu)
 Tsalpa Kagyu
 Baram Kagyu
 Pagtru Kagyu (or Phagmo Drugpa Kagyu):
 Taglung Kagyu
 Trophu Kagyu
 Drukpa Kagyu
 Martsang Kagyu
 Yerpa Kagyu
 Yazang Kagyu
 Shugseb Kagyu
 Drikung Kagyu
 Rime movement (ecumenical movement)
 Japanese Mikkyo
 Shingon
 Tendai (derived from Tiantai but added tantric practices)

Early Buddhist schools 

Early Buddhist schools
 
 Ekavyahārikas (during Aśoka)
 Lokottaravāda
 Golulaka (during Aśoka)
 Bahuśrutīya (late third century BCE)
 Prajñaptivāda (late third century BCE)
 Caitika (mid-first century BCE)
 Apara Śaila
 Uttara Śaila
 Cetiyavāda
 Sthaviravāda
 Pudgalavāda ('Personalist') (c. 280 BCE)
 Vatsīputrīya (during Aśoka) later name: Saṃmitīya
 Dharmottarīya
 Bhadrayānīya
 Sannāgarika
 Vibhajjavāda (prior to 240 BCE; during Aśoka)
 Theravāda (c. 240 BCE)
 Mahīśāsaka (after 232 BCE)
 Dharmaguptaka (after 232 BCE)
 Sarvāstivāda (c. 237 BCE)
 Kāśyapīya (after 232 BCE)
 Sautrāntika (between 50 BCE and c. 100 CE)
 Mūlasarvāstivāda (3rd and 4th centuries)
 Vaibhashika

Buddhist modernism 

Buddhist modernism
 Humanistic Buddhism
 Sōka Gakkai
 Vipassana movement
 New Kadampa Tradition
 Friends of the Western Buddhist Order
 Fo Guang Shan

Buddhism worldwide 

Buddhism by country

 Buddhism by country
 Buddhism in the East
 Tamil Buddhism
 Buddhism in Central Asia
 Buddhism in Southeast Asia
 East Asian Buddhism
 Buddhism in the Middle East
 Buddhism in the West
 Buddhism in the Americas
 Buddhism in Central America
 Buddhism in Australia
 Buddhism in Europe
 Buddhism in Africa

Buddhist scriptures and texts 

Buddhist texts

Theravada texts 

Pali literature

 Pāli Canon (Tipitaka)
 Vinaya Pitaka — Basket of Discipline
 Suttavibhanga
 Patimokkha — Buddhist Monastic Code
 Khandhaka
 Mahāvagga
 Cullavagga
 Parivara
 Sutta Pitaka — Basket of Discourses
 Digha Nikaya — the Long Discourses
 Brahmajala Sutta — Discourse on the Net of Perfect Wisdom
 Samaññaphala Sutta — The Fruit of Contemplative Life Discourse
 Kevatta Sutta
 Mahaparinibbana Sutta — The Last Days of the Buddha
 Mahasatipatthana Sutta — The Great Discourse on the Foundations of Mindfulness
 Aggañña Sutta
 Sigalovada Sutta
 Majjhima Nikaya — the Middle-length Discourses
 Sammaditthi Sutta — Discourse on Right View
 Satipatthana Sutta — The Discourse on the Foundations of Mindfulness
 Aggi-Vacchagotta Sutta
 Anapanasati Sutta — Discourse on Mindfulness of Breathing
 Samyutta Nikaya — the Connected Discourses
 Dhammacakkappavattana Sutta — Setting Rolling the Wheel of Truth (Buddha's first discourse)
 Anattalakkhana Sutta — The Nonself Characteristic (Buddha's second discourse)
 Fire Sermon — Buddha's third discourse
 Anguttara Nikaya — the Numerical Discourses
 Dighajanu Sutta
 Dona Sutta
 Kalama Sutta
 Upajjhatthana Sutta — Subjects for Contemplation
 Khuddaka Nikaya — the Minor Collection
 Khuddakapatha
 Mangala Sutta
 Ratana Sutta
 Karaṇīya Mettā Sutta — The Hymn of Universal Love
 Dhammapada — The Path of Truth
 Udana — Inspired utterances
 Itivuttaka
 Suttanipata
 Uraga Vagga
 Rhinoceros Horn Sutra
 Metta Sutta
 Cula Vagga
 Ratana Sutta
 Mangala Sutta
 Dhammika Sutta
 Maha Vagga
 Atthaka Vagga
 Parayana Vagga
 Vimanavatthu
 Petavatthu
 Theragatha — Verses of the Elder Monks
 Therigatha — Verses of the Elder Nuns
 Jataka tales — Buddha's former lives
 Niddesa
 Patisambhidamagga — Path of discrimination
 Apadana
 Buddhavamsa
 Cariyapitaka
 Nettipakarana
 Petakopadesa
 Milindapanha
 Abhidhamma Pitaka — Basket of Ultimate Doctrine
 Dhammasangani
 Vibhanga
 Dhatukatha
 Puggalapannatti
 Kathavatthu
 Yamaka
 Patthana
 Anupitaka — non-canonical or extra-canonical Pāli literature
 Paracanonical texts
 Commentaries — commentaries on the Tipitaka
 Subcommentaries — commentaries on the commentaries on the Tipitaka
 Visuddhimagga — The Path of Purification, considered the most important Theravada text outside of the Tipitaka canon of scriptures
 Vimuttimagga — The Path of Freedom, manual of meditation
 Abhidhammattha Sangaha — A Comprehensive Manual of Abhidhamma

Mahayana texts 

 Mahayana sutras
 Angulimaliya Sutra
 Brahmajala Sutra
 Innumerable Meanings Sutra
 Lalitavistara Sutra
 Lankavatara Sutra
 Lotus Sutra
 Perfection of Wisdom sutras (Prajñāpāramitā)
 Diamond Sutra
 Heart Sutra
 Ten Stages Sutra
 Vimalakirti-nirdesa Sutra
 Sutra of Perfect Enlightenment
 Platform Sutra
 Amitabha Sutra
 Avatamsaka Sutra
 Contemplation Sutra
 Infinite Life Sutra
 Mahaparinirvana Sutra
 Mahasamnipata Sutra
 Sanghata Sutra
 Shurangama Sutra
 Sutra of Forty-Two Sections
 Sutra of Golden Light
 Sutra of The Great Vows of Ksitigarbha Bodhisattva
 Ullambana Sutra
 Āgamas
 Chinese Buddhist canon
 Tripitaka Koreana

Vajrayana texts 
 Buddhist Tantras
Guhyasamāja Tantra
Mahavairocana Tantra
Vajrasekhara Sutra
Hevajra Tantra
Cakrasaṃvara Tantra
Guhyagarbha tantra 
Mañjuśrī-mūla-kalpa
Shurangama Sutra
Mañjuśrīnāmasamgīti
Kalachakra Tantra
Nyingma Gyubum
Guhyagarbha tantra 
Kulayarāja Tantra 
Seventeen tantras of Dzogchen
Vima Nyingtik
Longchen Nyingthig
 Tibetan Buddhist canon
 Kangyur
 Tengyur
Terma (hidden treasure) literature
Bardo Thodol

History of Buddhism 

History of Buddhism
 Timeline of Buddhism
 Pre-sectarian Buddhism
 Buddhist councils
 First Buddhist council
 Second Buddhist council
 Third Buddhist council
 Fourth Buddhist council
 Fifth Buddhist council
 Sixth Buddhist council
 World Buddhist Forum, 2006
 Silk Road transmission of Buddhism
 History of Buddhism in India
 Decline of Buddhism in India
 Greco-Buddhism
 Buddhism and the Roman world
 Buddhist crisis

Doctrines of Buddhism

Three Jewels (Tiratana • Triratna) 

Three Jewels
 Buddha — Gautama Buddha, the Blessed One, the Awakened One, the Teacher
 Accomplished (arahaṃ • arhat)
 Fully enlightened (sammā-sambuddho • samyak-saṃbuddha)
 Perfect in true knowledge and conduct (vijjā-caraṇa sampanno • vidyā-caraṇa-saṃpanna)
 Sublime (sugato • sugata)
 Knower of the worlds (lokavidū • loka-vid)
 Incomparable leader of persons to be tamed (anuttaro purisa-damma-sārathi • puruṣa-damya-sārathi)
 Teacher of devas and humans (satthā deva-manussānaṃ • śāsta deva-manuṣyāṇaṃ)
 The Enlightened One (buddho)
 The Blessed One (bhagavā • bhagavat)
 Dhamma (Dharma) — the cosmic principle of truth, lawfulness, and virtue discovered, fathomed, and taught by the Buddha; the Buddha's teaching as an expression of that principle; the teaching that leads to enlightenment and liberation
 Well expounded by the Blessed One (svākkhāto bhagavatā dhammo • svākhyāta)
 Directly visible (sandiṭṭhiko • sāṃdṛṣṭika)
 Immediate (akāliko • akālika)
 Inviting one to come and see (ehi-passiko • ehipaśyika)
 Worthy of application (opanayiko • avapraṇayika)
 To be personally experienced by the wise (paccattaṃ veditabbo viññūhi • pratyātmaṃ veditavyo vijñaiḥ)
 Saṅgha (Saṃgha) — the spiritual community, which is twofold (1) the monastic Saṅgha, the order of monks and nuns; and (2) the noble Saṅgha, the spiritual community of noble disciples who have reached the stages of world-transcending realization
 Practicing the good way (supaṭipanno bhagavato sāvaka-saṅgho)
 Practicing the straight way (ujupaṭipanno bhagavato sāvaka-saṅgho)
 Practicing the true way (ñāyapaṭipanno bhagavato sāvaka-saṅgho)
 Practicing the proper way (sāmīcipaṭipanno bhagavato sāvaka-saṅgho)
 Worthy of gifts (āhuṇeyyo)
 Worthy of hospitality (pāhuṇeyyo)
 Worthy of offerings (dakkhiṇeyyo)
 Worthy of reverential salutation (añjalikaraṇīyo)
 The unsurpassed field of merit for the world (anuttaraṃ puññākkhettaṃ lokassā)

Four Noble Truths (Cattāri ariyasaccāni • Catvāri āryasatyāni) 

Four Noble Truths

1. The Noble Truth of Suffering (Dukkha ariya sacca) 

 Suffering (dukkha • duḥkha) — to be fully understood (pariññeyya)
 Dukkha as intrinsic suffering, as bodily or mental pain (dukkha-dukkha)
 birth (jāti)
 old age (jarā)
 illness (byādhi)
 death (maraṇa)
 sorrow (soka)
 lamentation (parideva)
 pain (dukkha)
 grief (domanassa)
 despair (upāyāsā)
 Dukkha due to change (vipariṇāma-dukkha)
 Association with the unpleasant (appiyehi sampayogo)
 Separation from the pleasant (piyehi vippayogo)
 Not to get what one wants (yampicchaṃ na labhati tampi)
 Dukkha of conditioned formations (saṅkhāra-dukkha)
 Five aggregates of clinging (pañcupādānakkhandha)
 material form (rūpa)
 feeling (vedanā)
 perception (saññā • samjñā)
 mental formations (saṅkhāra • samskāra)
 consciousness (viññāṇa • vijñāna)

2. The Noble Truth of the Origin of Suffering (Dukkha samudaya ariya sacca) 
 Craving (taṇhā • tṛṣṇā) (samudaya) — to be abandoned (pahātabba)
 Craving for sensual pleasures (kāma taṇhā)
 Craving for existence (bhava taṇhā)
 Craving for non-existence (vibhava taṇhā)

3. The Noble Truth of the Cessation of Suffering (Dukkha nirodha ariya sacca) 
 Nirvana (Nibbāna • Nirvāṇa) (nirodha) — to be realized (sacchikātabba)
 Nibbāna element with residue remaining (sa-upādisesa nibbānadhātu • sopadhiśeṣa-nirvāṇa)
 Nibbāna element with no residue remaining (anupādisesa nibbānadhātu • nir-upadhiśeṣa-nirvāṇa) — Parinirvana (parinibbāna • parinirvāṇa)

4. The Noble Truth of the Path of Practice leading to the Cessation of Suffering (Dukkha nirodha gāminī paṭipadā ariya sacca) 

 Noble Eightfold Path (Ariyo aṭṭhaṅgiko maggo • Ārya 'ṣṭāṅga mārgaḥ) — to be developed (bhāvetabba)
 Right view
 Right intention
 Right speech
 Right action
 Right livelihood
 Right effort
 Right mindfulness
 Right concentration

Three Characteristics of Existence (Tilakkhaṇa • Trilakṣaṇa) 

Three marks of existence
 Impermanence (anicca • anitya)
 Suffering (dukkha • duḥkha)
 Nonself (anattā • anātman)

Five Aggregates (Pañca khandha • Pañca-skandha) 

Skandha
 Matter (Form) (rūpa)
 Four Great Elements (mahābhūta)
 Earth element (paṭhavī-dhātu)
 Water (or liquid) element (āpo-dhātu)
 Fire (or heat) element (tejo-dhātu)
 Air (or wind) element (vāyo-dhātu)
 Feeling (vedanā)
 Pleasant feeling (sukha)
 Painful feeling (dukkha • duḥkha)
 Neither-painful-nor-pleasant (neutral) feeling (adukkham-asukhā)
 Perception (saññā • samjñā)
 Mental formations (saṅkhāra • samskāra) — see below
 Consciousness (viññāṇa • vijñāna)

Dependent Origination (Paticcasamuppāda • Pratītyasamutpāda)

This/that Conditionality (Idappaccayatā) 

Describing the causal nature of everything in the universe, as expressed in the following formula:

Twelve Links (Nidāna) 

Describes how suffering arises.
 Ignorance (avijjā • avidyā)
 Not knowing suffering
 Not knowing the origin of suffering
 Not knowing the cessation of suffering
 Not knowing the way leading to the cessation of suffering
 Volitional formations (saṅkhāra • saṃskāra)
 Bodily formation
 Verbal formation
 Mental formation
 Consciousness (viññāṇa • vijñāna)
 Eye-consciousness
 Ear-consciousness
 Nose-consciousness
 Tongue-consciousness
 Body-consciousness
 Mind-consciousness
 Mind and body (nāmarūpa)
 Mind (nāma)
 Feeling (vedanā)
 Perception (saññā • samjñā)
 Volition (cetanā)
 Contact (phassa)
 Attention (manasikāra)
 Body/materiality/form (rūpa)
 Four Great Elements
 Earth — solidity
 Water — fluidity
 Fire — heat
 Wind — oscillation
 Six sense bases (saḷāyatana • ṣaḍāyatana)
 Eye-base
 Ear-base
 Nose-base
 Tongue-base
 Body-base
 Mind-base
 Contact (phassa • sparśa)
 Eye-contact
 Ear-contact
 Nose-contact
 Tongue-contact
 Body-contact
 Mind-contact
 Feeling (vedanā)
 Feeling born of eye-contact
 Feeling born of ear-contact
 Feeling born of nose-contact
 Feeling born of tongue-contact
 Feeling born of body-contact
 Feeling born of mind-contact
 Craving (taṇhā • tṛṣṇā)
 Craving for forms
 Craving for sounds
 Craving for odors
 Craving for flavors
 Craving for tangibles
 Craving for mind-objects
 Clinging (upādāna)
 Clinging to sensual pleasures (kāmupādāna)
 Clinging to views (diṭṭhupādāna)
 Clinging to rituals and observances (sīlabbatupādāna)
 Clinging to a doctrine of self (attavādupādāna)
 Being (bhava)
 Sense-sphere being
 Fine-material being
 Immaterial being
 Birth (jāti)
 Old age and death (jarāmaraṇa)

Transcendental Dependent Origination 
Describes the path out of suffering.
 Suffering (dukkha • duḥkha)
 Faith (saddhā • śraddhā)
 Joy (pāmojja)
 Rapture (pīti • prīti)
 Tranquillity (passaddhi)
 Happiness (sukha)
 Concentration (samādhi)
 Knowledge and vision of things as they really are (yathābhūta-ñāna-dassana)
 Disenchantment with worldly life (nibbidā)
 Dispassion (virāga)
 Freedom (vimutti)
 Knowledge of destruction of the taints (āsava-khaye-ñāna)

Karma (Kamma) 

Karma in Buddhism
 Definition — volitional action, considered particularly as a moral force capable of producing, for the agent, results that correspond to the ethical quality of the action; thus good karma produces happiness, and bad karma produces suffering
 Result of karma (vipāka)
 Intention (cetanā)
 Wholesome intention (kusala)
 Unwholesome intention (akusala)
 Three doors of action (kammadvara)
 Body — Bodily acts
 Speech — Verbal acts
 Mind — Mental acts
 Roots (mula)
 Unwholesome
 Greed (lobha • raga)
 Hatred (dosa • dvesha)
 Delusion (moha)
 Wholesome
 Nongreed (alobha) —  renunciation, detachment, generosity
 Nonhatred (adosa) — loving-kindness, sympathy, gentleness
 Nondelusion (amoha) — wisdom
 Courses of action (kammapatha)
 Unwholesome
 Bodily
 Destroying life
 Taking what is not given
 Wrong conduct in regard to sense pleasures
 Verbal
 False speech
 Slanderous speech
 Harsh speech
 Idle chatter
 Mental
 Covetousness
 Ill will
 Wrong view
 Wholesome
 Bodily
 Abstaining from destroying life
 Abstaining from taking what is not given
 Abstaining from wrong conduct in regard to sense pleasures
 Verbal
 Abstaining from false speech
 Abstaining from slanderous speech
 Abstaining from harsh speech
 Abstaining from idle chatter
 Mental
 Being free from covetousness
 Being free from ill will
 Holding right view
 Function
 Reproductive kamma (janaka kamma) — that which produces mental aggregates and material aggregates at the moment of conception
 Supportive kamma (upatthambhaka kamma) — that which comes near the Reproductive Kamma and supports it
 Obstructive kamma (upapiḍaka kamma) — that which tends to weaken, interrupt and retard the fruition of the Reproductive Kamma
 Destructive kamma (upaghātaka kamma) — that which not only obstructs but also destroys the whole force of the Reproductive Kamma
 Order to take effect
 Weighty kamma (garuka kamma) — that which produces its results in this life or in the next for certain
 Five heinous crimes, causing rebirth in hell immediately after death (ānantarika-kamma)
 Intentionally killing one's father (patricide)
 Intentionally killing one's mother (matricide)
 Intentionally killing an arahant
 Maliciously causing blood to flow from the body of a Buddha
 Creating a schism in the sangha
 Proximate kamma (āsanna kamma) — that which one does or remembers immediately before the dying moment
 Habitual kamma (āciṇṇa kamma) — that which one habitually performs and recollects and for which one has a great liking
 Reserve kamma (kaṭattā kamma) — refers to all actions that are done once and soon forgotten
 Time of taking effect
 Immediately effective kamma (diţţhadhammavedaniya kamma)
 Subsequently, effective kamma (upapajjavedaniya kamma)
 Indefinitely effective kamma (aṗarāpariyavedaniya kamma)
 Defunct kamma (ahosi kamma)
 Place of taking effect
 Immoral (akusala) kamma pertaining to the sense-sphere (kamavacara)
 Moral (kusala) kamma pertaining to the sense-sphere (kamavacara)
 Moral kamma pertaining to the form-sphere (rupavacara)
 Moral kamma pertaining to the formless-sphere (arupavacara)
 Niyama Dhammas
 Utu Niyama — Physical Inorganic Order (seasonal changes and climate), the natural law pertaining to physical objects and changes in the natural environment, such as the weather; the way flowers bloom in the day and fold up at night; the way soil, water and nutrients help a tree to grow; and the way things disintegrate and decompose. This perspective emphasizes the changes brought about by heat or temperature
 Bīja Niyama — Physical Organic Order (laws of heredity), the natural law pertaining to heredity, which is best described in the adage, “as the seed, so the fruit”
 Citta Niyama — Order of Mind and Psychic Law (will of mind), the natural law pertaining to the workings of the mind, the process of cognition of sense objects and the mental reactions to them
 Kamma Niyama — Order of Acts and Results (consequences of one's actions), the natural law pertaining to human behavior, the process of the generation of action and its results. In essence, this is summarized in the words, “good deeds bring good results, bad deeds bring bad results”
 Dhamma Niyama — Order of the Norm (nature's tendency to produce a perfect type), the natural law governing the relationship and interdependence of all things: the way all things arise, exist and then cease. All conditions are subject to change, are in a state of affliction and are not self: this is the Norm

Rebirth (Punabbhava • Punarbhava) 

 Saṃsāra — Lit., the "wandering," the round of rebirths without discoverable beginning, sustained by ignorance and craving

Buddhist cosmology 

Buddhist cosmology

 Six realms
 Heaven (sagga)
 Tusita — one of the six deva-worlds of the kāmadhātu
 Tāvatiṃsa — the fifth of the heavens of the kāmadhātu, and the highest of the heavens that maintains a physical connection with the rest of the world
 Four Heavenly Kings
 Demigod realm (asura)
 Human realm (mānusatta)
 Hungry Ghost realm (peta • preta)
 Animal realm
 Hell (niraya • naraka)
 Avīci — the lowest level of the hell realm
 Three planes of existence (tiloka • triloka)
 World of desire (kāmaloka)
 World of form (rūpaloka)
 World of formlessness (arūpaloka)
 Ten spiritual realms
 Buddhahood
 Bodhisattva — Bodhisattvahood
 Pratyekabuddha — Realization
 Sāvakabuddha — Learning
 Deva — Heaven
 Asura — Paranoid jealousy
 Human beings in Buddhism — Humanity
 Animals in Buddhism — Animality
 Preta — Hunger
 Naraka — Hell

Sense bases (Āyatana) 

Ayatana
 Six sense bases (saḷāyatana • ṣaḍāyatana)
 Eye (cakkhu) and Forms
 Ear (sota) and Sounds
 Nose (ghāṇa) and Odors
 Tongue (jivhā) and Flavors
 Body (kāya) and Tactile objects
 Mind (mano) and Phenomena

Six Great Elements (Dhātu) 
 Earth element (paṭhavī-dhātu)
 Water (or liquid) element (āpo-dhātu)
 Fire element (tejo-dhātu)
 Air (or wind) element (vāyo-dhātu)
 Space element (ākāsa-dhātu)
 Consciousness element (viññāṇa-dhātu)

Faculties (Indriya) 

Indriya
 Six sensory faculties
 Eye/vision faculty (cakkh-undriya)
 Ear/hearing faculty (sot-indriya)
 Nose/smell faculty
 Tongue/taste faculty (jivh-indriya)
 Body/sensibility faculty
 Mind faculty (man-indriya)
 Three physical faculties
 Femininity (itth-indriya)
 Masculinity (puris-indriya)
 Life or vitality
 Five feeling faculties
 Physical pleasure (sukh-indriya)
 Physical pain (dukkh-indriya)
 Mental joy (somanasa-indriya)
 Mental grief (domanass-indriya)
 Indifference (upekh-indriya)
 Five spiritual faculties
 Faith
 Energy (viriy-indriya)
 Mindfulness (sat-indriya)
 Concentration
 Wisdom (-indriya)
 Three final-knowledge faculties
 Thinking "I shall know the unknown"
 Gnosis
 One who knows

Formations (Saṅkhāra • Saṃskāra)

Mental Factors (Cetasika • Caitasika )

Theravāda abhidhamma
 Seven universal mental factors common to all; ethically variable mental factors common to all consciousnesses (sabbacittasādhāraṇa cetasikas)
 Contact (phassa)
 Feeling (vedanā)
 Perception (saññā)
 Volition (cetanā)
 One-pointedness (ekaggatā)
 Life Faculty (jīvitindriya)
 Attention (manasikāra)
 Six occasional or particular mental factors; ethically variable mental factors found only in certain consciousnesses (pakiṇṇaka cetasikas)
 Application of thought (vitakka)
 Examining (vicāra)
 Decision (adhimokkha)
 Energy (viriya)
 Rapture (pīti)
 Wholesome desire (chanda)
 Fourteen unwholesome mental factors (akusala cetasikas)
 Four universal unwholesome mental factors (akusalasādhāraṇa):
 Delusion (moha)
 Lack of shame (ahirika)
 Disregard for consequence (anottappa)
 Restlessness (uddhacca)
 Three mental factors of the greed-group (lobha):
 Greed (lobha)
 Wrong view (diṭṭhi)
 Conceit (māna)
 Four mental factors of the hatred-group (dosa)
 Hatred (dosa)
 Envy (issā)
 Miserliness (macchariya)
 Regret (kukkucca)
 Other unwholesome mental factors
 Sloth (thīna)
 Torpor (middha)
 Doubt (vicikicchā)
 Twenty-five beautiful mental factors (sobhana cetasikas)
 Nineteen universal beautiful mental factors (sobhanasādhāraṇa):
 Faith (saddhā)
 Mindfulness (sati)
 Shame at doing evil (hiri)
 Regard for consequence (ottappa)
 Lack of greed (alobha)
 Lack of hatred (adosa)
 Balance, neutrality of mind (tatramajjhattatā)
 Tranquillity of mental body (kāyapassaddhi)
 Tranquillity of consciousness (cittapassaddhi)
 Lightness of mental body (kāyalahutā)
 Lightness of consciousness (cittalahutā)
 Softness/malleability of mental body (kāyamudutā)
 Softness/malleability of consciousness (cittamudutā)
 Readiness/wieldiness of mental body (kāyakammaññatā)
 Readiness/wieldiness of consciousness (cittakammaññatā)
 Proficiency of mental body (kāyapāguññatā)
 Proficiency of consciousness (cittapāguññatā)
 Straightness/rectitude of mental body (kāyujukatā)
 Straightness/rectitude of consciousness (cittujukatā)
 Three Abstinences (virati):
 Right speech (sammāvācā)
 Right action (sammākammanta)
 Right livelihood (sammā-ājīva)
 Two Illimitables (appamañña):
 Compassion (karuṇā)
 Sympathetic joy (muditā)
 One Faculty of wisdom (paññindriya):
 Wisdom (paññā • prajñā)

Mahayana abhidharma
 Five universal mental factors (sarvatraga) common to all:
 Sparśa — contact, contacting awareness, sense impression, touch
 Vedanā — feeling, sensation
 Saṃjñā — perception
 Cetanā — volition
 Manasikara — attention

 Five determining mental factors (viṣayaniyata):
 Chanda — desire (to act), intention, interest
 Adhimoksha — decision, interest, firm conviction
 Smṛti — mindfulness
 Prajñā — wisdom
 Samādhi — concentration

 Eleven virtuous (kuśala) mental factors
 Sraddhā — faith
 Hrī — self-respect, conscientiousness, sense of shame
 Apatrāpya — decorum, regard for consequence
 Alobha — non-attachment
 Adveṣa — non-aggression, equanimity, lack of hatred
 Amoha — non-bewilderment
 Vīrya — diligence, effort
 Praśrabdhi — pliancy
 Apramāda — conscientiousness
 Upekṣa — equanimity
 Ahiṃsā — nonharmfulness

Six root mental defilements (mūlakleśa):
 Raga — attachment
 Pratigha — anger
 Avidya — ignorance
 Māna — pride, conceit
 Vicikitsa — doubt
 Dṛiṣṭi — wrong view

 Twenty secondary defilement (upakleśa):
Krodha — rage, fury
Upanāha — resentment
Mrakśa — concealment, slyness-concealment
Pradāśa — spitefulness
Irshya — envy, jealousy
Mātsarya — stinginess, avarice, miserliness
Māyā — pretense, deceit
Śāṭhya — hypocrisy, dishonesty
Mada — self-infatuation, mental inflation, self-satisfaction
Vihiṃsā — malice, hostility, cruelty, intention to harm
Āhrīkya — lack of shame, lack of conscious, shamelessness
Anapatrāpya — lack of propriety, disregard, shamelessness
Styāna — lethargy, gloominess
Auddhatya — excitement, ebullience
Āśraddhya — lack of faith, lack of trust
Kausīdya — laziness, slothfulness
Pramāda — heedlessness, carelessness, unconcern
Muṣitasmṛtitā — forgetfulness
Asaṃprajanya  — non-alertness, inattentiveness
Vikṣepa — distraction, desultoriness

 Four changeable mental factors (aniyata):
Kaukṛitya — regret, worry,
Middha — sleep, drowsiness
Vitarka — conception, selectiveness, examination
Vicāra — discernment, discursiveness, analysis

Mind and Consciousness 

 Citta — Mind, mindset, or state of mind
 Cetasika — Mental factors
 Manas — Mind, general thinking faculty
 Consciousness (viññāṇa)
 Mindstream (citta-saṃtāna) — the moment-to-moment continuity of consciousness
 Bhavanga — the most fundamental aspect of mind in Theravada
 Luminous mind (pabhassara citta)
 Consciousness-only (vijñapti-mātratā)
 Eight Consciousnesses (aṣṭavijñāna)
 Eye-consciousness — seeing apprehended by the visual sense organs
 Ear-consciousness — hearing apprehended by the auditory sense organs
 Nose-consciousness — smelling apprehended through the olfactory organs
 Tongue-consciousness — tasting perceived through the gustatory organs
 Ideation-consciousness — the aspect of mind known in Sanskrit as the "mind monkey"; the consciousness of ideation
 Body-consciousness — tactile feeling apprehended through skin contact, touch
 The manas consciousness — obscuration-consciousness — a consciousness which through apprehension, gathers the hindrances, the poisons, the karmic formations
 Store-house consciousness (ālāyavijñāna) — the seed consciousness, the consciousness which is the basis of the other seven
 Mental proliferation (papañca • prapañca) — the deluded conceptualization of the world through the use of ever-expanding language and concepts
 Monkey mind — unsettled, restless mind

Obstacles to Enlightenment 

 Taints (āsava)
 Sensual desire (kāmāsava)
 Becoming (bhavāsava)
 Wrong view (diṭṭhāsava)
 Ignorance (avijjāsava)
 Defilements (kilesa • kleśā)
 Three defilements
 Greed (lobha • rāga)
 Hatred (aversion) (dosa • dvesha)
 Delusion (moha)
 Round of defilements (kilesa-vaṭṭa)
 Ignorance (avijjā • avidyā)
 Craving (taṇhā • tṛṣṇā)
 Clinging (upādāna)
 Four perversions of view, thought and perception (vipallasa)
 Taking what is impermanent (anicca • anitya) to be permanent (nicca • nitya)
 Taking what is suffering (dukkha • duḥkha) to be happiness (sukha)
 Taking what is nonself (anattā • anātman) to be self (attā • ātman)
 Taking what is not beautiful (asubha) to be beautiful (subha)
 Five hindrances (pañca nīvaraṇā) — the main inner impediments to the development of concentration and insight
 Sensual desire (kāmacchanda) — craving for pleasure to the senses
 Ill-will (vyāpāda) — feelings of malice directed toward others
 Sloth and torpor (thīna-middha) — half-hearted action with little or no energy
 Restlessness and remorse (uddhacca-kukkucca) — the inability to calm the mind
 Doubt (vicikicchā) — lack of conviction or trust
 Latent tendencies (anusaya)
 Sensual passion (kāma-rāga)
 Resistance (patigha)
 Views (diṭṭhi)
 Doubt (vicikicchā)
 Conceit (māna)
 Craving for continued existence (bhavarāga)
 Ignorance (avijjā • avidyā)
 Ten Fetters (saṃyojana)
 Identity view (sakkāyadiṭṭhi) — the view of a truly existent self either as identical with the five aggregates, or as existing in some relation to them
 Eternity-belief (sassata-diṭṭhi)
 Annihilation-belief (uccheda-diṭṭhi)
 Doubt (vicikicchā) — doubt about the Buddha, the Dhamma, the Saṅgha, or the training
 Wrong grasp of rules and observances (sīlabbata-parāmāsa) — the belief that mere external observances, particularly religious rituals and ascetic practices, can lead to liberation
 Sensual lust (kāmacchando)
 Ill will (vyāpādo)
 Desire for existence in the form realm (rūparāgo)
 Desire for existence in the formless realm (arūparāgo)
 Conceit (māna)
 Restlessness (uddhacca)
 Ignorance (avijjā • avidyā)

Two Kinds of Happiness (Sukha) 
 Bodily pleasure (kayasukha)
 Mental happiness (cittasukha)

Two Kinds of Bhava 
 Kamma Bhava — kammas caused by four Upadanas
 Upapatti Bhava — rebirth bhava

Two Guardians of the World (Sukka lokapala) 
 Shame at doing evil (hiri)
 Fear of the results of wrongdoing (ottappa)

Three Conceits 
 "I am better"
 "I am equal"
 "I am worse"

Three Standpoints 
 Gratification (assāda)
 Danger (ādinava)
 Escape (nissaraṇa)

Three Primary Aims 
 Welfare and happiness directly visible in this present life, attained by fulfilling one's moral commitments and social responsibilities (diṭṭha-dhamma-hitasukha)
 Welfare and happiness pertaining to the next life, attained by engaging in meritorious deeds (samparāyika-hitasukha)
 The ultimate good or supreme goal, Nibbāna, final release from the cycle of rebirths, attained by developing the Noble Eightfold Path (paramattha)

Three Divisions of the Dharma 
 Study (pariyatti)
 Practice (paṭipatti)
 Realization (pativedha)

Four Kinds of Nutriment 
 Physical food [either gross or subtle] (kabalinkaro)
 Contact (phasso dutiyo)
 Mental volition (manosancetana)
 Consciousness (viññāṇa • vijñāna)

Four Kinds of Acquisitions (Upadhi) 
 The Five Aggregates (khandha • skandha)
 Defilements (kilesa • kleśā)
 Volitional formations (saṅkhāra • saṃskāra)
 Sensual pleasures (kāmacchanda)

Eight Worldly Conditions 
The "Eight Worldly Winds" referenced in discussions of Equanimity (upekkhā, upekṣhā) 
 Pleasure and pain
 Praise and blame
 Honour and dishonour
 Gain and loss

Truth (Sacca • Satya) 

 Four Noble Truths (cattāri ariyasaccāni • catvāri āryasatyāni)
 Suffering (dukkha • duḥkha)
 Cause of suffering (samudaya)
 Cessation of suffering (nirodha)
 Path leading to the cessation of suffering (magga • marga)
 Two truths doctrine
 Conventional truth (sammutisacca • saṃvṛtisatya)
 Ultimate truth (paramatthasacca • paramārthasatya)

Higher Knowledge (Abhiññā • Abhijñā) 

Abhijñā
 Six types of higher knowledges (chalabhiñña)
 Supernormal powers (iddhi)
 Multiplying the body into many and into one again
 Appearing and vanishing at will
 Passing through solid objects as if space
 Ability to rise and sink in the ground as if in water
 Walking on water as if land
 Flying through the skies
 Touching anything at any distance (even the moon or sun)
 Traveling to other worlds (like the world of Brahma) with or without the body
 Divine ear (dibba-sota), that is, clairaudience
 Mind-penetrating knowledge (ceto-pariya-ñāa), that is, telepathy
 Remembering one's former abodes (pubbe-nivāsanussati), that is, recalling one's own past lives
 Divine eye (dibba-cakkhu), that is, knowing others' karmic destinations
 Extinction of mental intoxicants (āsavakkhaya), upon which arahantship follows
 Three knowledges (tevijja)
 Remembering one's former abodes (pubbe-nivāsanussati)
 Divine eye (dibba-cakkhu)
 Extinction of mental intoxicants (āsavakkhaya)

Great fruits of the contemplative life (Maha-Phala) 

Phala
 Equanimity (upekkhā, upekṣhā) 
 Fearlessness (nibbhaya)
 Freedom from unhappiness & suffering (asukhacaadukkha)
 Meditative Absorption (samādhi)
 Out-of-body experience (manomaya)
 Clairaudience (dibba-sota)
 Intuition and mental telepathy (ceto-pariya-ñána)
 Recollection of past lives (patisandhi)
 Clairvoyance (dibba-cakkhu)
 The Ending of Mental Fermentations (samatha)

Concepts unique to Mahayana and Vajrayana 

 Bardo — Intermediate state
 Shinay bardo — the Bardo of This Life
 Milam bardo — the Bardo of Dream
 Samten bardo — the Bardo of Meditation
 Chikkhai bardo — the Bardo of Dying
 Chönyid bardo — the Bardo of Dharmata
 Sidpai bardo — the Bardo of Existence
 Bodhicitta — the wish to attain Buddhahood
 Bodhisattva — name given to anyone who has generated bodhicitta
 Buddha-nature — immortal potency or element within the purest depths of the mind, present in all sentient beings, for awakening and becoming a Buddha
 Dzogchen — the natural, primordial state or natural condition of every sentient being
 Eternal Buddha
 Lung (Tibetan Buddhism)
 Pure land
 Rainbow body — a body not made of flesh, but consists of pure light, an astral body
 Svabhava — Intrinsic nature
 Tathātā/Dharmatā — Thusness
 Dharmadhatu — Realm of Truth
 Four Dharmadhātu
 Terma
 Three Roots
 Lama
 Iṣṭha-deva(tā) — Yidam
 Dakini/Dharmapala
 Trikaya
 Nirmanakaya
 Sambhogakaya
 Dharmakāya
 Upāya — Skillful means
 Five Wisdoms

Other concepts 

 Emptiness (suññatā • śūnyatā)
 Middle Way (majjhimā paṭipadā • madhyamā-pratipad) — the Buddhist path of non-extremism
 Avoiding the extreme of sensual indulgence (kāmesu kāma-sukha-allika)
 Avoiding the extreme of self-mortification (atta-kilamatha)
 Sentient beings (satta • sattva)

Buddhist practices

Buddhist devotion 

Buddhist devotion
 Taking refuge in the Triple Gem
 Buddha
 Dharma
 Sangha
 Worship (pūjā) — see also: Abhisheka
 Offerings
 Prostration (panipāta • namas-kara)
 Chanting
 Mantra
 Om mani padme hum
 Namo Amituofo
 Nam Myōhō Renge Kyō
 Buddho
 Namo tassa bhagavato arahato sammāsambuddhassa — Homage to the Blessed One, the Worthy One, the Fully Self-enlightened One

Moral discipline and precepts (Sīla • Śīla) 

 Five Precepts (pañca-sīlāni • pañca-śīlāni)
 Abstaining from taking life (pāṇātipātā veramaṇī)
 Abstaining from taking what is not given (adinnādānā veramaṇī)
 Abstaining from sexual misconduct (kāmesu micchācāra veramaṇī)
 Abstaining from false speech (musāvāda veramaṇī)
 Abstaining from drinks and drugs that cause heedlessness (surā-meraya-majja-pamādaṭṭhānā veramaṇī)
 Eight Precepts (aṭṭhasīla)
 Abstaining from taking life (both human and non-human)
 Abstaining from taking what is not given (stealing)
 Abstaining from all sexual activity
 Abstaining from telling lies
 Abstaining from using intoxicating drinks and drugs which lead to carelessness
 Abstaining from eating at the wrong time (the right time is eating once, after sunrise, before noon)
 Abstaining from singing, dancing, playing music, attending entertainment performances, wearing perfume, and using cosmetics and garlands (decorative accessories)
 Abstaining from luxurious places for sitting or sleeping
 Ten Precepts (dasasīla)
 Abstaining from killing living things
 Abstaining from stealing
 Abstaining from un-chastity (sensuality, sexuality, lust)
 Abstaining from lying
 Abstaining from taking intoxicants
 Abstaining from taking food at inappropriate times (after noon)
 Abstaining from singing, dancing, playing music or attending entertainment programs (performances)
 Abstaining from wearing perfume, cosmetics and garland (decorative accessories)
 Abstaining from sitting on high chairs and sleeping on luxurious, soft beds
 Abstaining from accepting money
 Sixteen Precepts
 Three Treasures
 Taking refuge in the Buddha
 Taking refuge in the Dharma
 Taking refuge in the Sangha
 Three Pure Precepts
 Not Creating Evil
 Practicing Good
 Actualizing Good For Others
 Ten Grave Precepts
 Affirm life; Do not kill
 Be giving; Do not steal
 Honor the body; Do not misuse sexuality
 Manifest truth; Do not lie
 Proceed clearly; Do not cloud the mind
 See the perfection; Do not speak of others errors and faults
 Realize self and other as one; Do not elevate the self and blame others
 Give generously; Do not be withholding
 Actualize harmony; Do not be angry
 Experience the intimacy of things; Do not defile the Three Treasures
 Vinaya
 Pātimokkha (Pratimoksha) — the code of monastic rules binding on members of the Buddhist monastic order
 Parajika (defeats) — four rules entailing expulsion from the sangha for life
 Sexual intercourse, that is, any voluntary sexual interaction between a bhikkhu and a living being, except for mouth-to-mouth intercourse which falls under the sanghadisesa
 Stealing, that is, the robbery of anything worth more than 1/24 troy ounce of gold (as determined by local law.)
 Intentionally bringing about the death of a human being, even if it is still an embryo — whether by killing the person, arranging for an assassin to kill the person, inciting the person to die, or describing the advantages of death
 Deliberately lying to another person that one has attained a superior human state, such as claiming to be an arahant when one knows one is not, or claiming to have attained one of the jhanas when one knows one hasn't
 Sanghadisesa — thirteen rules requiring an initial and subsequent meeting of the sangha (communal meetings)
 Aniyata — two indefinite rules where a monk is accused of having committed an offence with a woman in a screened (enclosed) or private place by a lay person
 Nissaggiya pacittiya — thirty rules entailing "confession with forfeiture"
 Pacittiya — ninety-two rules entailing confession
 Patidesaniya — four violations which must be verbally acknowledged
 Sekhiyavatta —  seventy-five rules of training, which are mainly about the deportment of a monk
 Sāruppa — proper behavior
 Bhojanapatisamyutta — food
 Dhammadesanāpatisamyutta — teaching dhamma
 Pakinnaka — miscellaneous
 Adhikarana-samatha — seven rules for settlement of legal processes that concern monks only
 Bodhisattva vows
 Samaya — a set of vows or precepts given to initiates of an esoteric Vajrayana Buddhist order
 Ascetic practices (dhutanga) — a group of thirteen austerities, or ascetic practices, most commonly observed by Forest Monastics of the Theravada Tradition of Buddhism

Three Resolutions 
 To abstain from all evil (sabbapāpassa akaraṇaṃ)
 To cultivate the good (kusalassa upasampadā)
 To purify one's mind (sacittapariyodapanaṃ)

Three Pillars of Dharma 

 Generosity (dāna)
 Morality (sīla • śīla)
 Meditation (bhāvanā)

Threefold Training (Sikkhā) 

Threefold Training
 The training in the higher moral discipline (adhisīla-sikkhā) — morality (sīla • śīla)
 The training in the higher mind (adhicitta-sikkhā) — concentration (samādhi)
 The training in the higher wisdom (adhipaññā-sikkhā) — wisdom (paññā • prajñā)

Five Qualities 
 Faith (saddhā • śraddhā)
 Morality (sīla • śīla)
 Learning (suta)
 Generosity (cāga)
 Wisdom (paññā • prajñā)

Five Powers of a Trainee 
 Faith (saddhā • śraddhā)
 Conscience (hiri) — an innate sense of shame over moral transgression
 Fear of wrong-doing (ottappa) — moral dread, fear of the results of wrongdoing
 Energy (viriya • vīrya)
 Wisdom (paññā • prajñā)

Five Things that lead to Enlightenment 
 Admirable friendship (kalyāṇa-mittatā • kalyāṇa-mitratā)
 Morality (sīla • śīla)
 Hearing the Dhamma
 Exertion (viriya • vīrya)
 Awareness of impermanence (anicca-ñāṇa)

Five Subjects for Contemplation 

Upajjhatthana Sutta
 I am subject to ageing, I am not exempt from ageing
 I am subject to illness, I am not exempt from illness
 I am subject to death, I am not exempt from death
 There will be change and separation from all that I hold dear and near to me
 I am the owner of my actions, heir to my actions, I am born of my actions, I am related to my actions and I have my actions as refuge; whatever I do, good or evil, of that I will be the heir

Gradual training (Anupubbikathā) 

 Generosity (dāna)
 Virtue (sīla • śīla)
 Heaven (sagga)
 Danger of sensual pleasure (kāmānaṃ ādīnava)
 Renunciation (nekkhamma)
 The Four Noble Truths (cattāri ariyasaccāni • catvāri āryasatyāni)

Seven Good Qualities (Satta saddhammā) 
 Faith (saddhā • śraddhā)
 Conscience (hiri)
 Moral dread (ottappa)
 Learning (suta)
 Energy (viriya • vīrya)
 Mindfulness (sati • smṛti)
 Wisdom (paññā • prajñā)

Ten Meritorious Deeds (Dasa Punnakiriya vatthu) 

 Generosity (dāna)
 Morality (sīla • śīla)
 Meditation (bhāvanā)
 Paying due respect to those who are worthy of it (apacayana)
 Helping others perform good deeds (veyyavacca)
 Sharing of merit after doing some good deed (anumodana)
 Rejoicing in the merits of others (pattanumodana)
 Teaching the Dhamma (dhammadesana)
 Listening to the Dhamma (dhammassavana)
 Straightening one's own views

Perfections (Pāramī • Pāramitā)

Ten Theravada Pāramīs (Dasa pāramiyo) 

 Generosity (dāna)
 Morality (sīla)
 Renunciation (nekkhamma)
 Wisdom (paññā)
 Energy (viriya)
 Patience (khanti)
 Truthfulness (sacca)
 Determination (adhiṭṭhāna)
 Loving-kindness (mettā)
 Equanimity (upekkhā)

Six Mahayana Pāramitās 

 Generosity (dāna)
 Morality (śīla)
 Patience (kṣanti)
 Energy (vīrya)
 Concentration (dhyāna)
 Wisdom (prajñā)

States Pertaining to Enlightenment (Bodhipakkhiyādhammā • Bodhipakṣa dharma)

Four Foundations of Mindfulness (Cattāro satipaṭṭhānā • Smṛtyupasthāna) 

Satipatthana
 Mindfulness of the body (kāyagatāsati • kāyasmṛti)
 Mindfulness of breathing (ānāpānasati • ānāpānasmṛti)
 Mindfulness of the body (kāyanupassana) — first tetrad
 Breathing a long breath
 Breathing a short breath
 Experiencing the whole (breath-) body (awareness of the beginning, middle, and end of the breath)
 Tranquilizing the bodily formation
 Mindfulness of feelings (vedanānupassana) — second tetrad
 Experiencing rapture
 Experiencing bliss
 Experiencing the mental formation
 Tranquilizing the mental formation
 Mindfulness of the mind (cittanupassana) — third tetrad
 Experiencing the mind
 Gladdening the mind
 Concentrating the mind
 Liberating the mind
 Mindfulness of Dhammas (dhammānupassana) — fourth tetrad
 Contemplating impermanence (aniccānupassī)
 Contemplating fading away (virāgānupassī)
 Contemplating cessation (nirodhānupassī)
 Contemplating relinquishment (paṭinissaggānupassī)
 Postures
 Walking
 Standing
 Sitting
 Lying down
 Clear comprehension (sampajañña • samprajaña)
 Clear comprehension of the purpose of one's action (sātthaka)
 Clear comprehension of the suitability of one's means to the achievement of one's purpose (sappāya)
 Clear comprehension of the domain, that is, not abandoning the subject of meditation during one's daily routine (gocara)
 Clear comprehension of reality, the awareness that behind one's activities there is no abiding self (asammoha)
 Reflections on repulsiveness of the body, meditation on the thirty-two body parts (patikulamanasikara)
 head hairs
 body hairs
 nails
 teeth
 skin
 flesh
 tendons
 bones
 bone marrow
 kidneys
 heart
 liver
 pleura (or diaphragm)
 spleen
 lungs
 intestines
 mesentery
 stomach
 feces
 bile
 phlegm
 pus
 blood
 sweat
 fat
 tears
 skin-oil
 saliva
 mucus
 synovial fluid
 urine
 brain
 Reflections on the material elements (mahābhūta)
 Earth
 Water
 Fire
 Wind
 Cemetery contemplations (asubha)
 Swollen or bloated corpse
 Corpse brownish black or purplish blue with decay
 Festering or suppurated corpse
 Corpse splattered half or fissured from decay
 Corpse gnawed by animals such as wild dogs and foxes
 Corpse scattered in parts, hands, legs, head and body being dispersed
 Corpse cut and thrown away in parts after killing
 Bleeding corpse, i.e. with red blood oozing out
 Corpse infested with and eaten by worms
 Remains of a corpse in a heap of bones, i.e. skeleton
 Mindfulness of feelings (vedanāsati • vedanāsmṛti)
 Pleasant feeling
 Worldly pleasant feeling
 Spiritual pleasant feeling
 Painful feeling
 Worldly painful feeling
 Spiritual painful feeling
 Neither-pleasant-nor-painful (neutral) feeling
 Worldly neutral feeling
 Spiritual neutral feeling
 Mindfulness of the mind (cittasati • cittasmṛti)
 With lust (sarāga) or without lust (vītarāga)
 With hate (sadosa) or without hate (vītadosa)
 With delusion (samoha) or without delusion (vītamoha)
 Contracted (sakhitta) or scattered (vikkhitta)
 Lofty (mahaggata) or not lofty (amahaggata)
 Surpassable (sa-uttara) or unsurpassed (anuttara)
 Quieted (samāhita) or not quieted (asamāhita)
 Released (vimutta) or not released (avimutta)
 Mindfulness of mental phenomena (dhammāsati • dharmasmṛti)
 Hindrances
 Aggregates of clinging
 Sense bases and their fetters
 Seven factors of enlightenment
 Four Noble Truths

Four Right Efforts (Cattārimāni sammappadhānāni • Samyak-pradhāna) 

Four Right Exertions
 The effort to prevent the arising of unarisen unwholesome mental states (anuppādāya)
 The effort to abandon arisen unwholesome mental states (pahānāya)
 The effort to generate unarisen wholesome mental states (uppādāya)
 The effort to maintain and perfect arisen wholesome mental states (ṭhitiyā)

Four Roads to Mental Power (Iddhipāda • Ṛddhipāda) 

Iddhipada
 Concentration due to desire (chanda)
 Concentration due to energy (viriya • vīrya)
 Concentration due to mind (citta)
 Concentration due to investigation (vīmaṃsā)

Five Spiritual Faculties (Pañca indriya) 

Indriya
 Faith (saddhā • śraddhā) — faith in the Buddha's awakening
 Energy (viriya • vīrya) — exertion towards the Four Right Efforts
 Mindfulness (sati • smṛti) — focusing on the four satipatthana
 Concentration (samādhi) — achieving the four jhānas
 Wisdom (paññā • prajñā) — discerning the Four Noble Truths

Five Powers (Pañca bala) 

Five Strengths
 Faith (saddhā • śraddhā) — controls doubt
 Energy (viriya • vīrya) — controls laziness
 Mindfulness (sati • smṛti) — controls heedlessness
 Concentration (samādhi) — controls distraction
 Wisdom (paññā • prajñā) — controls ignorance

Seven Factors of Enlightenment (Satta sambojjhaṅgā • Sapta bodhyanga) 

Seven Factors of Enlightenment

Neutral 
 Mindfulness (sati • smṛti)

Arousing 
 Investigation of doctrine (dhamma vicaya • dharma-vicaya)
 Energy (viriya • vīrya)
 Rapture (pīti • prīti)

Calming 
 Tranquillity (passaddhi)
 Concentration (samādhi)
 Equanimity (upekkhā • upekṣā)

Noble Eightfold Path (Ariya aṭṭhaṅgika magga • Ārya 'ṣṭāṅga mārgaḥ) 

Noble Eightfold Path

Wisdom (Paññākkhandha) 

 Right view (sammā-diṭṭhi • samyag-dṛṣṭi)
 Mundane right view
 Karma
 Supramundane right view
 Right view that accords with the Four Noble Truths (saccanulomika sammā-diṭṭhi)
 Study
 Contemplation
 Meditation
 Right view that penetrates the Four Noble Truths (saccapativedha sammā-diṭṭhi)
 Right intention (sammā-saṅkappa • samyak-saṃkalpa)
 The intention of renunciation (nekkhamma-sankappa)
 The intention of non-ill will (abyapada-sankappa)
 The intention of harmlessness (avihimsa-sankappa)

Moral discipline (Sīlakkhandha) 
 Right speech (sammā-vācā • samyag-vāc)
 Abstaining from false speech (musāvāda veramaṇī)
 Abstaining from slanderous speech (pisunaya vacaya veramaṇī)
 Abstaining from harsh speech (pharusaya vacaya veramaṇī)
 Abstaining from verbal abuse
 Abstaining from insults
 Abstaining from sarcasm
 Abstaining from idle chatter (samphappalāpa veramaṇī)
 Right action (sammā-kammanta • samyak-karmānta)
 Abstaining from the taking of life (pāṇātipātā veramaṇī)
 Abstaining from homicide
 Abstaining from animal slaughter
 Abstaining from hunting
 Abstaining from fishing
 Abstaining from killing insects
 Abstaining from deliberately harming or torturing another being
 Abstaining from taking what is not given (adinnādānā veramaṇī)
 Abstaining from stealing
 Abstaining from robbery
 Abstaining from snatching
 Abstaining from fraudulence
 Abstaining from deceitfulness
 Abstaining from sexual misconduct (kāmesu micchācāra veramaṇī)
 Abstaining from adultery
 Abstaining from sexual harassment
 Abstaining from rape
 Right livelihood (sammā-ājīva • samyag-ājīva)
 Abstaining from dealing in weapons
 Abstaining from dealing in living beings (including raising animals for slaughter as well as slave trade and prostitution)
 Abstaining from dealing in meat production and butchery
 Abstaining from dealing in poisons
 Abstaining from dealing in intoxicants
 Abstaining from deceit
 Abstaining from treachery
 Abstaining from soothsaying
 Abstaining from trickery
 Abstaining from usury

Concentration (Samādhikkhandha) 
 Right effort (sammā-vāyāma • samyag-vyāyāma)
 The effort to prevent the arising of unarisen unwholesome states of mind (samvarappadhana)
 Wise attention (yoniso manasikara)
 Restraint of the sense faculties (indriya-samvara)
 The effort to abandon unwholesome states of mind that have already arisen (pahanappadhana)
 Overcoming the Five hindrances
 The effort to generate wholesome states of mind that have not yet arisen (bhavanappadhana)
 Seven Factors of Enlightenment  (satta sambojjhaṅgā • sapta bodhyanga)
 Mindfulness (sati)
 Investigation of doctrine (dhamma vicaya)
 Energy (viriya • vīrya)
 Rapture (pīti)
 Tranquillity (passaddhi)
 Concentration (samādhi)
 Equanimity (upekkha)
 The effort to maintain and perfect wholesome states of mind already arisen (anurakkhanappadhana)
 Right mindfulness (sammā-sati • samyak-smṛti)
 Contemplation of the body (kāyanupassana)
 Contemplation of feeling (vedanānupassana)
 Contemplation of states of mind (cittanupassana)
 Contemplation of phenomena (dhammānupassana)
 Right concentration (sammā-samādhi • samyak-samādhi)
 Four jhānas
 First jhāna (pathamajjhana)
 Second jhāna (dutiyajjhana)
 Third jhāna (tatiyajjhana)
 Fourth jhāna (catutthajjhana)

Acquired factors 
 Right knowledge (sammā-ñāṇa)
 Right liberation (sammā-vimutti)

Buddhist meditation

Theravada meditation practices

Tranquillity/Serenity/Calm (Samatha • Śamatha) 

Samatha

 Place of work (kammaṭṭhāna)
 Ten Kasinas
 Earth kasina (pathavikasinam)
 Water kasina (apokasinam)
 Fire kasina (tejokasinam)
 Wind kasina (vayokasinam)
 Brownish or deep purplish blue kasina (nilakasinam)
 Yellow kasina (pitakasinam)
 Red kasina (lohitakasinam)
 White kasina (odatakasinam)
 Light kasina (alokakasinam)
 Open air-space, sky kasina (akasakasinam)
 Ten reflections on repulsiveness (asubas)
 A swollen or bloated corpse (uddhumatakam)
 A corpse brownish black or purplish blue with decay (vinilakam)
 A festering or suppurated corpse (vipubbakam)
 A corpse splattered half or fissured from decay (vicchiddakam)
 A corpse gnawed by animals such as wild dogs and foxes (vikkhayittakam)
 A corpse scattered in parts, hands, legs, head and body being dispersed (vikkhitakam)
 A corpse cut and thrown away in parts after killing (hatavikkhittakam)
 A bleeding corpse, i.e. with red blood oozing out (lohitakam)
 A corpse infested with and eaten by worms (puluvakam)
 Remains of a corpse in a heap of bones, i.e. skeleton (atthikam)
 Ten Recollections (anussati • anusmriti)
 Buddhānussati (Buddhanusmrti) — Recollection of the Buddha — fixing the mind with attentiveness and reflecting repeatedly on the glorious virtues and attributes of Buddha
 Dhammānussati (Dharmanusmrti) — Recollection of the Dhamma — reflecting with serious attentiveness repeatedly on the virtues and qualities of Buddha's teachings and his doctrine
 Saṅghānussati (Sanghanusmrti) — Recollection of the Saṅgha — fixing the mind strongly and repeatedly upon the rare attributes and sanctity of the Sangha
 Sīlānussati — Recollection of virtue — reflecting seriously and repeatedly on the purification of one's own morality or sīla
 Cāgānussati — Recollection of generosity — reflecting repeatedly on the mind's purity in the noble act of one's own dāna, charitableness and liberality
 Devatānussati — Recollection of deities — reflecting with serious and repeated attention on one's own complete possession of the qualities of absolute faith (saddhā), morality (sīla), learning (suta), liberality (cāga) and wisdom (paññā) just as the devas have, to enable one to be reborn in the world of devas
 Maraṇānussati — Mindfulness of death — reflecting repeatedly on the inevitability of death
 Kāyagatāsati — Mindfulness of the body — reflecting earnestly and repeatedly on the impurity of the body which is composed of the detestable 32 constituents such as hair, body hair, nails, teeth, skin, etc.
 Ānāpānasati — Mindfulness of breathing — repeated reflection on the inhaled and exhaled breath
 Upasamānussati — Recollection of peace — reflecting repeatedly with serious attentiveness on the supreme spiritual blissful state of Nirvana
 Four Divine Abidings (brahmavihāra)
 Loving-kindness (mettā • maitrī)
 Compassion (karuṇā)
 Sympathetic joy (muditā)
 Equanimity (upekkhā • upekṣā)
 Four formless jhānas (arūpajhāna)
 Base of the infinity of space (ākāsānañcāyatana)
 Base of the infinity of consciousness (viññāṇañcāyatana)
 Base of nothingness (ākiñcaññāyatana)
 Base of neither-perception-nor-nonperception (nevasaññānāsaññāyatana)
 Perception of disgust of food (aharepatikulasanna)
 Four Great Elements (mahābhūta)
 Earth element (paṭhavī-dhātu)
 Water (or liquid) element (āpo-dhātu)
 Fire element (tejo-dhātu)
 Air (or wind) element (vāyo-dhātu)

Concentration (Samādhi) 

 Sign (nimitta)
 Learning sign (uggahanimitta)
 Counterpart sign (paṭibhāganimitta)
 Momentary concentration (khaṇikasamādhi)
 Preliminary concentration (parikammasamādhi)
 Neighbourhood concentration (upacārasamādhi)
 Nine attainments (samāpatti)
 Attainment concentration (appanāsamādhi)
 Jhāna (Dhyāna) — states of deep meditative concentration marked by the one-pointed fixation of the mind upon its object
 Four form jhānas (rūpajhāna)
 First jhāna (pathamajjhana)
 initial application (vittaka)
 sustained application (vicāra)
 rapture (pīti)
 bliss (sukha)
 one-pointedness (ekaggata)
 Second jhāna (dutiyajjhana)
 rapture (pīti)
 bliss (sukha)
 one-pointedness (ekaggata)
 Third jhāna (tatiyajjhana)
 bliss (sukha)
 one-pointedness (ekaggata)
 Fourth jhāna (catutthajjhana)
 one-pointedness (ekaggata)
 equanimity (upekkhā • upekṣā)
 Four formless jhānas (arūpajhāna)
 Base of the infinity of space (ākāsānañcāyatana)
 Base of the infinity of consciousness (viññāṇañcāyatana)
 Base of nothingness (ākiñcaññāyatana)
 Base of neither-perception-nor-nonperception (nevasaññānāsaññāyatana)
 Cessation of perception and feeling (nirodha-samāpatti)

Insight meditation (Vipassanā • Vipaśyanā) 

 Insight knowledge (vipassanā-ñāṇa)
 Vipassana jhanas
 Eighteen kinds of insight
 Contemplation on impermanence (aniccanupassana) overcomes the wrong idea of permanence
 Contemplation on unsatisfactoriness (dukkhanupassana) overcomes the wrong idea of real happiness
 Contemplation on non-self (anattanupassana) overcomes the wrong idea of self
 Contemplation on disenchantment (revulsion) (nibbidanupassana) overcomes affection
 Contemplation on dispassion (fading away) (viraganupassana) overcomes greed
 Contemplation on cessation (nirodhanupassana) overcomes the arising
 Contemplation on giving up (patinissagganupassana) overcomes attachment
 Contemplation on dissolution (khayanupassana) overcomes the wrong idea of something compact
 Contemplation on disappearance (vayanupassana) overcomes kamma-accumulation
 Contemplation on changeableness (viparinamanupassana) overcomes the wrong idea of something immutable
 Contemplation on the signless (animittanupassana) overcomes the conditions of rebirth
 Contemplation on the desireless (appanihitanupassana) overcomes longing
 Contemplation on emptiness (suññatanupassana) overcomes clinging
 Higher wisdom and insight (adhipaññadhamma vipassana) overcomes the wrong idea of something substantial
 True eye of knowledge (yathabhuta ñanadassana) overcomes clinging to delusion
 Contemplation on misery (adinavanupassana) overcomes clinging to desire
 Reflecting contemplation (patisankhanupassana) overcomes thoughtlessness
 Contemplation on the standstill of existence (vivattanupassana) overcomes being entangled in fetters
 Sixteen Stages of Vipassanā Knowledge
 Knowledge to distinguish mental and physical states (namarupa pariccheda ñāṇa)
 Knowledge of the cause-and-effect relationship between mental and physical states (paccaya pariggaha ñāṇa)
 Knowledge of mental and physical processes as impermanent, unsatisfactory and nonself (sammasana ñāṇa)
 Knowledge of arising and passing away (udayabbaya ñāṇa)
 Knowledge of the dissolution of formations (bhanga ñāṇa)
 Knowledge of the fearful nature of mental and physical states (bhaya ñāṇa)
 Knowledge of mental and physical states as unsatisfactory (adinava ñāṇa)
 Knowledge of disenchantment (nibbida ñāṇa)
 Knowledge of the desire to abandon the worldly state (muncitukamayata ñāṇa)
 Knowledge which investigates the path to deliverance and instills a decision to practice further (patisankha ñāṇa)
 Knowledge which regards mental and physical states with equanimity (sankharupekha ñāṇa)
 Knowledge which conforms to the Four Noble Truths (anuloma ñāṇa)
 Knowledge of deliverance from the worldly condition (gotrabhu ñāṇa)
 Knowledge by which defilements are abandoned and are overcome by destruction (magga ñāṇa)
 Knowledge which realizes the fruit of the path and has nibbana as object (phala ñāṇa)
 Knowledge which reviews the defilements still remaining (paccavekkhana ñāṇa)

Zen meditation practices 
 Zazen
 Concentration
 Kōan — a story, dialogue, question, or statement in Zen, containing aspects that are inaccessible to rational understanding, yet may be accessible to intuition
 Shikantaza — just sitting

Vajrayana meditation practices 
 Tonglen
 Tantra
 Anuttarayoga Tantra
 Generation stage
 Completion stage
 Margaphala
 Ngöndro — Four thoughts which turn the mind towards Dharma
 The freedoms and advantages of precious human rebirth
 The truth of impermanence and change
 The workings of karma
 The suffering of living beings within Samsara

Other practices 

 Ahimsa — Non-violence
 Appamada — Heedfulness
 Chöd — advanced spiritual practice and discipline arising from confluences of Bonpo, Mahasidda, Nyingmapa traditions and now practiced throughout the schools of Tibetan Buddhism
 Merit
 Paritta — Protection
 Samvega and pasada
 Simran

Attainment of Enlightenment 

Enlightenment in Buddhism

General 

 Nirvana (Nibbāna • Nirvāṇa) — the final goal of the Buddha's teaching; the unconditioned state beyond the round of rebirths, to be attained by the destruction of the defilements; Full Enlightenment or Awakening, the cessation of suffering; saupādisesa-nibbāna-dhātu — Nibbāna with residue remaining
 Parinirvana (Parinibbāna • Parinirvāṇa) — final passing away of an enlightened person, final Nibbāna, Nibbāna at death; anupādisesa-nibbāna-dhātu — Nibbāna without residue remaining
 Bodhi — the awakening attained by the Buddha and his accomplished disciples, referring to insight into the Four Noble Truths and the Noble Eightfold Path
 Types of Buddha
 Sammāsambuddha (Samyak-saṃbuddha) — one who, by his own efforts, attains Nirvana, having rediscovered the Noble Eightfold Path after it has been lost to humanity, and makes this Path known to others
 Paccekabuddha (Pratyekabuddha) — "a lone Buddha", a self-awakened Buddha, but one who lacks the ability to spread the Dhamma to others
 Sāvakabuddha (Śrāvakabuddha) — enlightened 'disciple of a Buddha'. Usual being named Arhat

Theravada 

 Four stages of enlightenment (see also: Ariya-puggala — Noble Ones)
 Sotāpanna — Stream-enterer (first stage of enlightenment) — one who has "opened the eye of the Dhamma", and is guaranteed enlightenment after no more than seven successive rebirths, having eradicated the first three fetters
 The four factors leading to stream-entry
 Association with superior persons
 Hearing the true Dhamma
 Careful attention
 Practice in accordance with the Dhamma
 The four factors of a stream-enterer
 Possessing confirmed confidence in the Buddha
 Possessing confirmed confidence in the Dhamma
 Possessing confirmed confidence in the Sangha
 Possessing moral virtues dear to the noble ones
 Sakadagami — Once-returner (second stage of enlightenment) — will be reborn into the human world once more, before attaining enlightenment, having eradicated the first three fetters and attenuated greed, hatred, and delusion
 Anāgāmi — Non-returner (third stage of enlightenment) — does not come back into human existence, or any lower world, after death, but is reborn in the "Pure Abodes", where he will attain Nirvāṇa, having eradicated the first five fetters
 Arahant — "Worthy One", (see also: Arhat), a fully enlightened human being who has abandoned all ten fetters, and who upon decease (Parinibbāna) will not be reborn in any world, having wholly abandoned saṃsāra

Mahayana 

 Bodhisattva — one who has generated bodhicitta, the spontaneous wish to attain Buddhahood
 Bodhisattva Bhumis — stages of enlightenment through which a bodhisattva passes

Zen 

 Satori — a Japanese Buddhist term for "enlightenment", which translates as a flash of sudden awareness, or individual enlightenment
 Kensho — "Seeing one's nature"

Buddhist monasticism and laity 

Buddhist monasticism
 Disciple 声闻弟子ShengWenDiZi (sāvaka • śrāvaka)
 Male lay follower (忧婆塞 YouPoSai) (upāsaka) and Female lay follower (忧婆夷 YouPoYi) (upāsikā)
 Householder 在家弟子ZaiJiaDiZi
 Dhammacārī — lay devotees who have seriously committed themselves to Buddhist practice for several years
 Anāgārika — lay attendant of a monk
 近侍Jisha (Japan), JinShi (chinese) — personal attendant of a monastery's abbot or teacher in Chan/Zen Buddhism
 Ngagpa — non-monastic male practitioners of such disciplines as Vajrayana, shamanism, Tibetan medicine, Tantra and Dzogchen
 Thilashin — Burmese Buddhist female lay renunciant
 Mae ji — Buddhist laywomen in Thailand occupying a position somewhere between that of an ordinary lay follower and an ordained monk
 Lower ordination (pabbajja • pravrajya)
 Novice monk (sāmaṇera • śrāmaṇera)
 Novice nun (samaṇerī • śrāmaṇerī)
 Higher ordination (upasampadā)
 Monk (bhikkhu • bhikṣu)
 Nun (bhikkhunī • bhikṣuṇī)
 Titles for Buddhist teachers
 General
 Acariya (Ācārya) — teacher
 Upajjhaya (Upādhyāya) — preceptor
 Pandita — a learned master, scholar or professor in Buddhist philosophy
 Bhante — Venerable Sir
 in Theravada
 in Southeast Asia
 Ayya — commonly used as a veneration in addressing or referring to an ordained Buddhist nun
 in Thailand
 Ajahn — Thai term which translates as teacher
 Luang Por — means "venerable father" and is used as a title for respected senior Buddhist monastics
 in Burma
 Sayādaw — a Burmese senior monk of a monastery
 in China
 和尚，Heshang — high-ranking or highly virtuous Buddhist monk; respectful designation for Buddhist monks in general
 僧侣，SengLv — Monk
 住持，ZhuChi — Abbot
 禅师，ChanShi — Chan/Zen Master
 法师，FaShi — Dharma Master
 律师，LvShi — Vinaya Master, teacher who focuses on the discipline and precepts
 开山祖师，KaiShanZuShi — founder of a school of Buddhism or the founding abbot of a Zen monastery
 比丘，BiQiu — transliteration of Bhikkhu
 比丘尼，BiQiuNi — transliteration of Bhikkhuni
 沙弥，ShaMi — transliteration of Samanera
 沙弥尼，ShaMiNi — transliteration of Samaneri
 尼姑，NiGu — Nun
 论师，LunShi — Abhidharma Master, one who is well versed in the psychology, thesis and higher teachings of Buddhism
 师兄，ShiXiong — dharma brothers, used by laity to address each other, note that all male or female lay disciples are called 'Dharma Brothers'
 in Japan
 Ajari — a Japanese term that is used in various schools of Buddhism in Japan, specifically Tendai and Shingon, in reference to a "senior monk who teaches students
 和尚 Oshō — high-ranking or highly virtuous Buddhist monk; respectful designation for Buddhist monks in general
 in Zen
 in Japan
 开山 Kaisan — founder of a school of Buddhism or the founding abbot of a Zen monastery
 老师 Roshi — a Japanese honorific title used in Zen Buddhism that literally means "old teacher" or "elder master" and usually denotes the person who gives spiritual guidance to a Zen sangha
 先生 Sensei — ordained teacher below the rank of roshi
 Zen master — individual who teaches Zen Buddhism to others
 in Korea
 Sunim — Korean title for a Buddhist monk or Buddhist nun
 in Tibetan Buddhism
 Geshe — Tibetan Buddhist academic degree for monks
 Guru
 Khenpo — academic degree similar to that of a doctorate or Geshe. Khenpos often are made abbots of centers and monasteries
 Khenchen — academic degree similar in depth to post doctorate work. Senior most scholars often manage many Khenpos
 Lama — Tibetan teacher of the Dharma
 Rinpoche — an honorific which literally means "precious one"
 Tulku — an enlightened Tibetan Buddhist lama who has, through phowa and siddhi, consciously determined to take birth, often many times, in order to continue his or her Bodhisattva vow

Major figures of Buddhism 

List of Buddhists

Founder 
 Gautama Buddha — The Buddha, Siddhattha Gotama (Pali), Siddhārtha Gautama (Sanskrit), Śākyamuni (Sage of the Sakya clan), The Awakened One, The Enlightened One, The Blessed One, Tathāgata (Thus Come One, Thus Gone One)

Buddha's disciples and early Buddhists

Chief Disciples 
 Sāriputta — Chief disciple, "General of the Dhamma", foremost in wisdom
 Mahamoggallāna — Second chief disciple, foremost in psychic powers

Great Disciples

Monks 

 Ānanda — Buddha's cousin and personal attendant
 Maha Kassapa — Convener of First Buddhist Council
 Anuruddha — Half-cousin of the Buddha
 Mahakaccana — Foremost in teaching
 Nanda — Half-brother of the Buddha
 Subhuti
 Punna
 Upali — Master of the Vinaya

Nuns 
 Mahapajapati Gotami — Eldest nun, half-mother of Buddha
 Khema — First great female disciple in power
 Uppalavanna — Second great female disciple
 Patacara — Foremost exponent of the Vinaya, the rules of monastic discipline

Laymen 
 Anathapindika — Chief lay disciple, foremost disciple in generosity
 Hatthaka of Alavi
 Jivaka
 Citta — the foremost householder for explaining the Teaching
 Cunda

Laywomen 
 Khujjuttara
 Velukandakiya
 Visakha
 Rohini
 Sujata

First five disciples of the Buddha 
 Kondañña — the first Arahant
 Assaji — converted Sāriputta and Mahamoggallāna
 Bhaddiya
 Vappa
 Mahanama

Two seven-year-old Arahants 
 Samanera Sumana
 Samanera Pandita

Other disciples 
 Channa — royal servant and head charioteer of Prince Siddhartha
 Angulimala — mass murderer turned saint
 Kisa Gotami

Later Indian Buddhists (after Gotama Buddha) 
 Ashoka - emperor of the Indian subcontinent emperor from 268 to 232 BCE and a convert who facilitated the spread of Buddhism across Asia
 Sanghamitta — daughter of Emperor Ashoka
 Mahinda — son of Emperor Ashoka
 Nagarjuna — founder of the Madhyamaka school
 Aryadeva — disciple of Nagarjuna
 Asanga — exponent of the yogācāra school
 Vasubandhu
 Buddhaghosa — 5th-century Indian Theravadin Buddhist commentator and scholar, author of the Visuddhimagga
 Buddhapālita — commentator on the works of Nagarjuna and Aryadeva
 Candrakīrti
 Dharmakirti
 Atisha
 B. R. Ambedkar - a Father of modern India, Polymath, Revivalist of Buddhism

Indo-Greek Buddhists 
 Dharmaraksita
 Nagasena

Chinese Buddhists 
 Bodhidharma
 Dajian Huineng
 Ingen

Tibetan Buddhists 

 Je Tsongkhapa
 Milarepa
 Longchenpa
 Marpa Lotsawa
 Padmasambhava
 Drogmi — founder of the Sakya school of Tibetan Buddhism
 Sakya Pandita
 Panchen Lama
 Karmapa
 Dalai Lama
 1st Dalai Lama
 2nd Dalai Lama
 3rd Dalai Lama
 4th Dalai Lama
 5th Dalai Lama
 6th Dalai Lama
 7th Dalai Lama
 8th Dalai Lama
 9th Dalai Lama
 10th Dalai Lama
 11th Dalai Lama
 12th Dalai Lama
 13th Dalai Lama
 14th Dalai Lama

Japanese Buddhists 
 Saichō
 Kūkai
 Hōnen
 Shinran
 Dōgen
 Eisai
 Nichiren

Vietnamese Buddhists 
 Trần Thái Tông
 Trần Thánh Tông
 Trần Nhân Tông
 Trần Anh Tông
 Trần Minh Tông
 Trần Hiến Tông
 Trần Dụ Tông
 Trần Nghệ Tông
 Trần Duệ Tông
 Trần Hưng Đạo
 Trần Thuận Tông
 Trần Thiếu Đế
 Lý Thái Tổ
 Lý Thái Tông
 Lý Thường Kiệt
 Lý Long Tường
 Thich Quang Duc
 Thích Trí Quang
 Thích Nhất Hạnh
 Thich Thiên Ân
 Thích Quảng Độ
 Thích Thanh Từ
 Thích Nhật Từ
 Thich Chan Khong

Burmese Buddhists 
 Ledi Sayadaw
 Mahāsī Sayādaw
 Mother Sayamagyi
 S. N. Goenka
 U Ba Khin
 U Nārada
 U Pandita
 Webu Sayadaw

Thai Buddhists 

 Ajahn Buddhadasa
 Ajahn Chah
Ajahn Lee
 Ajahn Maha Bua
 Ajahn Mun Bhuridatta
 Ajahn Thate

Sri Lankan Buddhists 
 Balangoda Ananda Maitreya
 Henepola Gunaratana
 K. Sri Dhammananda
 Piyadassi Maha Thera
 Walpola Rahula

American Buddhists 
 Ajahn Sumedho
 Bhikkhu Bodhi
 Thanissaro Bhikkhu

Brazilian Buddhists 

 Ajahn Mudito
 Monja Coen
 Lama Michel Rinpoche

British Buddhists 
 Ajahn Amaro
 Ajahn Brahm
 Ajahn Khemadhammo
Houn Jiyu-Kennett
 Ñāṇamoli Bhikkhu
 Ñāṇavīra Thera
 Arthur Lillie

German Buddhists 
 Ayya Khema
 Bhikkhu Analayo
 Muho Noelke
 Nyanatiloka
 Nyanaponika Thera

Irish Buddhists 
 U Dhammaloka

Buddhist philosophy 

Buddhist philosophy

 Abhidharma (Abhidhamma)
 Buddhist anarchism
 Buddhist atomism
 Buddhism and the body
 Buddhology
 Engaged Buddhism
 Buddhist economics
 Buddhist eschatology
 Buddhist ethics
 Buddhism and abortion
 Buddhism and euthanasia
 Buddhism and sexuality
 Buddhist views on masturbation
 LGBT topics and Buddhism
 Buddhism and evolution
 Four imponderables
 Fourteen unanswerable questions
 Questions referring to the world: concerning the existence of the world in time
 Is the world eternal?
 or not?
 or both?
 or neither?
 Questions referring to the world: concerning the existence of the world in space
 Is the world finite?
 or not?
 or both?
 or neither?
 Questions referring to personal experience
 Is the self identical with the body?
 or is it different from the body?
 Questions referring to life after death
 Does the Tathagata exist after death?
 or not?
 or both?
 or neither?
 God in Buddhism
 Humanistic Buddhism
 Buddhist logic
 Buddhist mythology
 Reality in Buddhism
 Buddhist socialism

Buddhist culture 

 Alms
 Ango — three-month-long period of intense training for students of Zen Buddhism
 Buddhist architecture
 Vihara — Buddhist monastery
 Wat — monastery temple in Cambodia, Thailand, Lanna or Laos
 Thai temple art and architecture
 Stupa — mound-like structure containing Buddhist relics
 Pagoda — tiered tower with multiple eaves common in China, Japan, Korea, Vietnam, and other parts of Asia
 Zendo — meditation hall in Zen Buddhism
 Butsudan — shrine
 Buddhist art
 Greco-Buddhist art
 Standing Buddha
 Buddhist poetry
 Buddhist music
 Buddha statue
 Colossal Buddha statues
 Tian Tan Buddha
 Kamakura Great Buddha
 Grand Buddha at Ling Shan
 Leshan Giant Buddha
 Gifu Great Buddha
 Great Buddha
 Buddhist calendar
 Buddhist clothes
 Tricivara — Monastic robe
 Antaravasaka — Lower robe
 Uttarasanga — Upper robe
 Sangati — Outer robe
 Buddhist cuisine
 Buddhist vegetarianism
 Dharani
 Drubchen — traditional form of meditation retreat in Tibetan Buddhism
 Funeral (Buddhism)
 Buddhist holidays
 Vesak — birth, enlightenment (Nirvana), and passing away (Parinirvana) of Gautama Buddha
 Asalha Puja
 Magha Puja
 Uposatha — the Buddhist observance days, falling on the days of the full moon and new moon, when the monks gather to recite the Pātimokkha and lay people often visit monasteries and temples to undertake the eight precepts
 Kathina — festival which comes at the end of Vassa
 Kaicho
 Kīla — three-sided peg, stake, knife, or nail like ritual implement traditionally associated with Indo-Tibetan Buddhism
 Mandala — concentric diagram having spiritual and ritual significance
 Sand mandala
 Buddhist prayer beads — Mala
 Mantra
 Om mani padme hum
 Namo Amituofo
 Nam Myōhō Renge Kyō
 Om tare tuttare ture svaha
 Buddho
 Namo Tassa Bhagavato Arahato Sammāsambuddhassa
 Buddhist view of marriage
 Mudra — Symbolic or ritual gesture
 Añjali Mudrā — greeting gesture which consists of putting the palms together in front of the chest
 Buddhist music
 Prayer wheel
 Sarira — Buddhist relics
 Sesshin — period of intensive meditation (zazen) in a Zen monastery
 Buddhist symbolism
 Dharmacakra — Wheel of Dhamma
 Bhavacakra — Wheel of Becoming
 Buddhist flag
 Ensō — Symbol in Zen symbolizing enlightenment, strength, elegance, the Universe, and the void
 Thangka
 Tree of physiology
 Ashtamangala
 Vajra — short metal weapon that has the symbolic nature of a diamond
 Vassa — Rains retreat

Buddhist pilgrimage 

Buddhist pilgrimage

 The Four Main Sites
 Lumbini — Buddha's birthplace
 Maya Devi Temple
 Bodh Gaya — Buddha's place of Enlightenment
 Mahabodhi Temple
 Bodhi Tree
 Sarnath — Place of Buddha's first discourse
 Kushinagar — Place of Buddha's final passing away
 Four Additional Sites
 Sravasti
 Rajgir
 Sankassa
 Vaishali
 Other Sites
 Patna
 Gaya
 Kosambi
 Mathura
 Kapilavastu
 Devadaha
 Kesariya
 Pava
 Nalanda
 Varanasi
 Later Sites
 Sanchi
 Ratnagiri
 Ellora
 Ajantha
 Bharhut

Comparative Buddhism 

 Buddhism and science
 Buddhism and psychology
 Buddhism and Theosophy
 Buddhism and other religions
 Buddhism and Eastern religions
 Buddhism and Hinduism
 Buddhism and Jainism
 Buddhism and Christianity
 Buddhist-Christian Studies
 Parallels between Buddha and Jesus
 Buddhism and Gnosticism
 Gautama Buddha in world religions

Other topics related to Buddhism 

 Access to Insight — Readings in Theravada Buddhism website
 Anuradhapura
 Mahavihara
 Abhayagiri Vihara
 Asceticism
 Ashoka the Great
 Basic points unifying Theravāda and Mahāyāna
 Bodhimanda (Bodhimandala)
 Bodhisatta — a future Buddha, one destined to attain unsurpassed perfect enlightenment; specifically, it is the term the Buddha uses to refer to himself in the period prior to his enlightenment, both in past lives and in his last life before he attained enlightenment
 Bodhisattva
 Akasagarbha
 Avalokiteśvara (Guan Yin)
 Guan Yu
 Ksitigarbha
 Mahasthamaprapta
 Metteyya/Maitreya — Future Buddha, successor of Gautama Buddha
 Manjusri — the bodhisattva associated with wisdom, doctrine and awareness
 Nio
 Samantabhadra
 Shantideva
 Sitatapatra
 Skanda
 Supushpachandra
 Suryaprabha
 Tara
 Vajrapani
 Vasudhara
 Borobudur — ninth-century Mahayana Buddhist Monument in Magelang, Indonesia
 Brahmā — according to the brahmins, the supreme personal deity, but in the Buddha's teaching, a powerful deity who rules over a high divine state of existence called the brahma world; more generally, the word denotes the class of superior devas inhabiting the form realm
 Brahmacharya — the Holy Life
 Budai or Hotei — the obese Laughing Buddha, usually seen in China
 Buddhas
 Gautama Buddha
 Dipankara Buddha
 Kakusandha Buddha
 Kassapa Buddha
 Koṇāgamana Buddha
 Padumuttara Buddha
 Adi-Buddha
 Amitābha — the principal Buddha in the Pure Land sect
 Medicine Buddha
 Buddhas of Bamyan
 Buddhavacana — the Word of the Buddha
 Buddhist calendar
 Buddhist Initiation Ritual — a public ordination ceremony wherein a lay student of Zen Buddhism receives certain Buddhist precepts, "a rite in which they publicly avow allegiance to 'The Three Refuges' of Buddhist practice: The Buddha, the Dharma and the Sangha
 Buddhist Publication Society — a charity whose goal is to explain and spread the doctrine of the Buddha
 Buddhist studies
 Cambridge Buddhist Association
 Chakravartin — Wheel-turning Monarch
 Critical Buddhism
 Dalit Buddhist movement
 Deva — a deity or god; the beings inhabiting the heavenly worlds, usually in the sense-sphere realm but more broadly in all three realms
 Dhammakaya
 Wat Phra Dhammakaya
 Dhammakaya Movement
 Dhammakaya meditation
 Dharma name
 Dharma talk
 Dharma transmission
 Diamond Way Buddhism
 Dipavamsa
 Eight Thoughts of a Great Man 
 This Dhamma is for one who wants little, not for one who wants much.
 This Dhamma is for the contented, not for the discontented.
 This Dhamma is for the secluded, not for one fond of society.
 This Dhamma is for the energetic, not for the lazy.
 This Dhamma is for the mindful, not for the unmindful.
 This Dhamma is for the composed, not for the uncomposed.
 This Dhamma is for the wise, not for the unwise.
 This Dhamma is for one who is free from impediments, not for one who delights in impediments
 Empowerment
 European Buddhist Union
 Five Dhyani Buddhas
 Vairocana
 Akshobhya
 Amitābha
 Ratnasambhava
 Amoghasiddhi
 Five Pure Lights
 Foundation for the Preservation of the Mahayana Tradition
 Friends of the Western Buddhist Order
 Gandhabba
 Gandhāran Buddhist Texts
 Glossary of Japanese Buddhism
 Hinayana — "Inferior vehicle", often interpreted as a pejorative term used in Mahayana doctrine to refer to the early Buddhist schools
 Icchantika
 Inka
 International Buddhist College
 Jambudvipa — lit., "rose-apple island," the Indian subcontinent
 Jetavana
 Kalachakra
 Kalpa (aeon) — an aeon or cosmic cycle, the period of time it takes for a world system to arise, evolve, dissolve, and persist in a state of disintegration before a new cycle begins
 Kanthaka — Prince Siddhartha's favourite white horse
 Kegon
 King Ajātasattu
 King Bimbisāra
 King Menander I (King Milinda)
 King Pasenādi
 Kosala
 Kwan Um School of Zen
 Laughing Buddha
 Life release - Practice of saving the lives of beings destined for slaughter
 Lineage
 Liturgical languages
 in Theravada
 Pāḷi
 in Mahayana
 Sanskrit
 Buddhist Hybrid Sanskrit
 Luang Prabang
 Mahasati meditation
 Mahavamsa
 Māra — "The Evil One" or "Tempter"; a malevolent deity who tries to prevent people from practicing the Dhamma and thereby escaping the round of rebirths
 Klesa-māra, or Māra as the embodiment of all unskillful emotions
 Mrtyu-māra, or Māra as death, in the sense of the ceaseless round of birth and death
 Skandha-māra, or Māra as metaphor for the entirety of conditioned existence
 Devaputra-māra, or Māra the son of a deva (god), that is, Māra as an objectively existent being rather than as a metaphor
 Medicine Buddha
 Monasteries
 Angkor Wat
 Phra Pathom Chedi
 Shaolin Monastery
 Shwedagon Pagoda
 Wat Phra Dhammakaya
 Wat Phra Kaew
 Wat Phrathat Doi Suthep
 Nāga — the Serpent King
 Nikāya
 Nikaya Buddhism
 Noble Silence
 Pali Text Society
 Perfection of Wisdom School
 Persecution of Buddhists
 Phra Pathom Chedi
 Preaching
 Purity in Buddhism
 Pyrrhonism
 Ramifications of the Buddha concept
 Reincarnation
 Saddhamma — True Dhamma
 Sakka — the King of gods
 Samaṇa
 Six samana
 Purana Kassapa
 Makkhali Gosala
 Ajita Kesakambali
 Pakudha Kaccayana
 Nigaṇṭha Nātaputta (Mahavira)
 Sanjaya Belatthaputta
 Samāpatti — correct acquisition of Truth
 Sāsana — Dispensation
 Shakya — ancient kingdom of Iron Age India, Siddhartha Gautama's clan
 Shambhala Buddhism
 Southern, Eastern and Northern Buddhism
 Sumeru — central world-mountain in Buddhist cosmology
 Sutra
 The birth of Buddha (Lalitavistara)
 The Path to Nirvana
 Three Ages of Buddhism
 Three Turnings of the Wheel of Dharma
 Triratna Buddhist Community
 True Buddha School
 Two foremost teachers (two persons which one can never pay back gratitude-debts in full)
 One's mother
 One's father
 Vipassana movement
 Women in Buddhism
 World Buddhist Sangha Council
 World Fellowship of Buddhists
 Yakkha — a broad class of nature-spirits, usually benevolent, who are caretakers of the natural treasures hidden in the earth and tree roots
 Yama — King of Death
 Yana — Vehicle
 Śrāvakayāna — the hearer vehicle
 Pratyekayana — the individual vehicle
 Bodhisattvayāna
 Young Buddhist Association
 Young Men's Buddhist Association
 Zabuton — rectangular meditation cushion
 Zafu — round meditation cushion

Lists 
 Glossary of Buddhism
 Index of Buddhism-related articles
 List of Buddhas
 List of the twenty-eight Buddhas
 List of Buddha claimants
 List of bodhisattvas
 List of Buddhists
 List of modern scholars in Buddhist studies
 List of suttas
 in Theravada
 List of Digha Nikaya suttas
 List of Majjhima Nikaya suttas
 List of Samyutta Nikaya suttas
 List of Anguttara Nikaya suttas
 List of Khuddaka Nikaya suttas
 in Mahayana
 Mahayana sutras
 List of Buddhist temples
 Buddhist temples in Japan
 List of Buddhist temples in Kyoto
 Korean Buddhist temples
 List of Buddhist Architecture in China
 List of Buddhist temples in Thailand
 List of writers on Buddhism
 Buddha games list

See also 

 Outline of religion

Charts

Notes

References

External links 

Outlines of religions
Wikipedia outlines